The Markham Thunder was a professional women's ice hockey team in the Canadian Women's Hockey League (CWHL). From 1998 through 2017, the franchise was known as the Brampton Thunder and Brampton Canadettes-Thunder before relocating from Brampton, Ontario, to Markham, Ontario, for the 2017–18 season. The CWHL ceased operations in 2019 and no further statements or actions were taken with the franchise.

Team history

The city of Brampton had a long history of women's ice hockey, starting with the creation of the Brampton Canadettes in 1963, whose management created the Dominion Ladies Hockey Tournament in 1967 (operating today as the Canadettes Easter Tournament).

In 1998, after local athlete Cassie Campbell returned home from her silver-medal victory with Team Canada in the successful introduction of women's ice hockey at the 1998 Nagano Olympics, she commiserated with Brampton acting mayor Sue Fennell about the lack of a top level women's team in Brampton. Fennell purchased a franchise, which she named the Brampton Thunder, in the Central Ontario Women's Hockey League (COWHL), a league which had operated since 1980. From its first 1998–99 COWHL season, the Thunder played its home games in the Brampton Centre for Sports & Entertainment (renamed the Powerade Centre in 2005), which also started operation in 1998.

On 15 February 1999, during the 1998–99 COWHL season, Fennell was instrumental in turning the COWHL into the National Women's Hockey League (NWHL), becoming its first President.

The Brampton Thunder won the first NWHL Championship Cup, in 1998–99. The Thunder would also win the final NWHL Championship Cup, in 2006–07. In between, the Thunder appeared in three other NWHL Championship Cup finals, but were defeated by the Beatrice Aeros in 2002, the Calgary Oval X-Treme in 2004, and the Montreal Axion in 2006. They also played in the Esso Women's Nationals and were victorious in 2006, defeating the Montreal Axion to claim the national title. The Thunder also had the distinction of having their home arena serve as the site of all NWHL Championship Cup games.

The Brampton Thunder was a significant contributor to the roster of the Canadian national women's hockey team at the 2006 Winter Olympics, with three players (Vicky Sunohara, Jayna Hefford, and Gillian Ferrari) contributing to Canada's gold medal win. Brampton Thunder player Kathleen Kauth also participated in the 2006 Winter Olympics, playing for the bronze medal-winning American national women's hockey team. A fifth Brampton Thunder player, goaltender Cindy Eadie, also participated in the Olympics, in 2004, with the Canadian softball team.

In 2007, the NWHL suspended operations. Players from the seven disbanded NWHL teams joined seven corresponding teams in the new Canadian Women's Hockey League (CWHL). Players from the NWHL Brampton Thunder joined the new CWHL franchise Brampton Canadettes-Thunder (generally called the Brampton Thunder), continuing the legacy of Brampton's women's ice hockey teams, starting with the 1963 Canadettes team and the 1998 Thunders team.

On January 18, 2011, the Thunder competed against the Montreal Stars at the Invista Centre in Kingston, Ontario - team captain Jayna Hefford’s hometown. Her number 15 was raised to the rafters of the Invista Centre on behalf of the Kingston Area Minor Hockey Association. As of 2012, no sweaters bearing Hefford’s number will be used in Kingston Minor Hockey. On November 2, 2011, Jesse Scanzano appeared in one game for the Brampton Thunder, on loan from the Toronto Aeros. The game was an exhibition contest versus her alma mater, the Mercyhurst Lakers. In the second period of said contest, Scanzano scored the game-winning goal as the Thunder defeated the Lakers 3–1.

In the CWHL championship game of the 2012 Clarkson Cup, Brampton fell to the Montreal Stars 4–2. Two Thunder players earned awards for their play in the 2012 Clarkson Cup, with the Outstanding Defender award going to Molly Engstrom, while netminder Liz Knox earned the Outstanding Goaltender award.

At the 3rd CWHL All-Star Game, Jess Jones of the Thunder, along with Jillian Saulnier both scored a hat trick, becoming the first competitors in CWHL All-Star Game history to achieve the feat.

The renamed Markham Thunder won the 2018 Clarkson Cup as CWHL Playoffs Champions. Against the Kunlun Red Star for the Clarkson Cup championship game, Markham's Laura Stacey scored with 2:11 left in the 4-on-4 overtime for a 2–1 victory and its first Cup win.

Season-by-season

Note: GP = Games played, W = Wins, L = Losses, T = Ties, OTL = Overtime losses, GF = Goals for, GA = Goals against, Pts = Points.

NCAA exhibitions

CWHL draft picks
The following is a listing of their top draft picks. For full draft information, please see the respective draft pages.

Team captains

Scoring leaders

Year-by-year

All-time leaders

Awards and honours
 Brampton Canadettes Thunder won the first CWHL championship on 22 March 2008, winning 4–3 over the Mississauga Chiefs in the final.
 Markham Thunder won their first Clarkson Cup as CWHL Champions on 25 March 2018. The 2–1 win in overtime featured goals from Nicole Brown, and Laura Stacey. 
 Lori Dupuis, Top forward in the 2010 Clarkson Cup
 Molly Engstrom, Top defender in the 2010 Clarkson Cup
Bobbi-Jo Slusar, Player of the Game,  2010 Clarkson Cup Final
Courtney Birchard, Outstanding Rookie of the Year, 2011
 Liz Knox, Top Goaltender of the Clarkson Cup, 2012
Laura Fortino, Defensemen of the Year, 2015–16
Tyler Fines, Coach of the Year, 2015–16
Jess Jones, Co-winner, 2017 Angela James Bowl
Laura Stacey, Rookie of the Year, 2016–17
 Jamie Lee Rattray, 2018 Jayna Hefford Trophy
 Erica Howe, Most Valuable Player, 2018 Clarkson Cup
 Victoria Bach, Rookie of the Year, 2018–19
 Jim Jackson, Coach of the Year, 2018–19

Notable players
 Gillian Apps
 Victoria Bach
 Megan Bozek
 Delaney Collins
 Lori Dupuis
 Molly Engstrom
 Laura Fortino
 Jayna Hefford
 Erica Howe
 Jocelyne Larocque
 Cherie Piper
 Jamie Lee Rattray
 Laura Stacey
 Vicky Sunohara

References

External links
 

Brampton Thunder
Thunder
Sport in Markham, Ontario
Ice hockey clubs established in 1999
Women's ice hockey teams in Canada
Ice hockey teams in Ontario
Canadian Women's Hockey League teams
National Women's Hockey League (1999–2007) teams
1999 establishments in Ontario
Women in Ontario
2019 disestablishments in Ontario
Ice hockey clubs disestablished in 2019